Joseph Haltern (died 5 September 1818) was a translator of German literature into Hebrew and a member of the Me'assefim. Among other works, Haltern wrote Esther, a Hebrew adaptation of Jean Racine's drama of the same name, and published a translation of Gellert's fables.

Notes

References
 

Year of birth missing
1818 deaths
19th-century German translators
Hebrew-language playwrights
Jewish dramatists and playwrights
Jewish translators
Translators from German
Translators to Hebrew